The Law Society of Newfoundland Labrador founded in 1834 (as Newfoundland Law Society and current name in 1999) is the statutory body charged with the regulation of the legal profession in the Canadian province of Newfoundland and Labrador.

References

Newfoundland and Labrador
Lawyers in Newfoundland and Labrador
Newfoundland and Labrador law
1834 establishments in the British Empire
Organizations established in 1834